The Municipality of Renče–Vogrsko is a municipality in the Goriška region of Slovenia. It was created in 2006, when it split from the City Municipality of Nova Gorica. The seat of the municipality is the village of Bukovica

Settlements
In addition to the municipal seat of Bukovica, the municipality also includes the following settlements:

 Dombrava
 Oševljek
 Renče
 Vogrsko
 Volčja Draga

References

External links

 Municipality of Renče–Vogrsko website
 Municipality of Renče–Vogrsko at Geopedia

 
Rence-Vogrsko
2006 establishments in Slovenia